Blahbalicious is a machinima film made using the Quake game engine. It was recorded by Mackey 'Avatar' McCandlish and Brian 'Wendigo' Hess and released at 11pm ET on Monday 8 December 1997. The film's unconventional style, Monty Python-esque humour, and extensive use of new models and maps earned it an amount of attention unprecedented in the Quake movie community at the time. At the inaugural Quake Movie Awards, organised by the Quake Movie Library, it won seven awards, plus an Honorary Oscar to recognise director Wendigo's contribution to the Quake movie community, indicating how it was at the peak of the movement at the time.

The film does not have a linear plot. Instead, it depicts a series of loosely linked sketches, nearly all of which involve a large rotund figure originally created for other purposes by the authors. The character is used to represent many different people in the film, all of which say little other than 'blah blah blah' (hence the title). The concept was designed to be, in the words of Wendigo, "these two fat guys would be watching TV And flipping through channels".

Sketches

References

1997 films
Animated comedy films
1990s animated short films
Machinima based on a Quake series engine
1997 animated films